The southern masked weaver (Ploceus velatus), or African masked weaver, is a resident breeding bird species common throughout southern Africa.

This weaver is very widespread and found in a wide range of habitats, including shrubland, savanna, grassland, open woodland, inland wetlands and semi-desert areas. It also occurs in suburban gardens and parks.

Description
The adult male in breeding plumage has a black face, throat and beak, red eye, bright yellow head and underparts, and a plain yellowish-green back,

The female has a pinkish-brown bill, brown or red-brown eye and is dull greenish-yellow, streaked darker on the upper back. The throat is yellowish, fading to off-white on the belly.  The non-breeding male resembles the female but retains the red eye. The juvenile of this species is like the female.

The call is a harsh swizzling, similar to other weavers. It also utters a sharp chuk alarm note.

Behaviour and ecology

Nest building and breeding
The southern masked weaver nests in colonies, mainly from September to January. Males have several female partners, and build a succession of nests, typically 25 each season. The nests, like those of other weavers, are woven from reed, palm or grass. A female will line a selected nest with soft grass and feathers. The nest is built in a tree, often over water, but sometimes in suburbia. This weaver also nests in reeds.

The southern masked weaver lays eggs of a various colour and this helps it to evade parasitisation by cuckoos because the cuckoo has no way of knowing what kind of eggs are inside the weaver's nest until it has entered the nest to attempt to lay one itself.  Eggs of the wrong colouration are ejected by the nest owners.

Feeding
The southern masked weaver is usually seen singly or in small groups. It may also form larger flocks, alone or with other seed eating species. It eats insects, seeds and nectar, and will come to feeding tables.

Gallery

References

General references 
 Ian Sinclair, Phil Hockey and Warwick Tarboton, SASOL Birds of Southern Africa (Struik 2002) 
 SASOL e-guide

Citations

External links

 Southern Masked Weaver Ploceus velatus in Weaver Watch
 Masked Weaver Swartkeelgeelvink Ploceus velatus in the Southern African Bird Atlas

Birds described in 1819
Birds of Southern Africa
Taxa named by Louis Jean Pierre Vieillot
Ploceus